Britton Municipal Airport  is a city-owned, public-use airport located two nautical miles (3.7 km) northeast of the central business district of Britton, a city in Marshall County, South Dakota, United States. According to the FAA's National Plan of Integrated Airport Systems for 2009–2013, it is categorized as a general aviation airport.

Although many U.S. airports use the same three-letter location identifier for the FAA and IATA, this airport is assigned BTN by the FAA and TTO by the IATA (which assigned BTN to Marlboro County Jetport in Bennettsville, South Carolina).

Facilities and aircraft 

For the 12-month period ending December 2, 2008, the airport had 5,500 general aviation aircraft operations, an average of 15 per day. At that time there were 8 aircraft based at this airport: 87.5% single-engine and 12.5% multi-engine.

References

External links 
  at South Dakota DOT Airport Directory
 Aerial image as of 6 October 1997 from USGS The National Map
 
 

Airports in South Dakota
Buildings and structures in Marshall County, South Dakota
Transportation in Marshall County, South Dakota